In Hawaiian mythology, Ukupanipo is a shark god who controls the amount of fish close enough for the fisherman to catch.
He occasionally adopts a human child who gains the power to transform into a shark, but when in human form has a mark like a shark's mouth under their shoulder blades.

Notes 

Hawaiian gods
Fish gods